Domestic Digital Bus may refer to:

 D²B, (IEC 61030) a low-speed IEC serial bus standard for home automation applications
 Domestic Digital Bus (automotive), a high-speed isochronous ring network technology for automotive applications